Caseara is a municipality located in the Brazilian state of Tocantins. Its population was 5,442 (2020) and its area is 1,692 km².

The municipality contains 10.66% of the  Ilha do Bananal / Cantão Environmental Protection Area, created in 1997.
The headquarters and visitor center of Cantão State Park are located just outside the town of Caseara.  The municipality plans to open a hiking/bicycle trail from the town center to the park's visitor center in 2014.

References

Municipalities in Tocantins